Second Sight was a commercial bulletin board system (BBS) program written by Scott Watson, who founded The FreeSoft Company of Beaver Falls, Pennsylvania for the Apple Macintosh.  It was the second program from Watson, the first being the Red Ryder terminal emulator. When first released it was known as Red Ryder Host, later becoming White Knight, and finally Second Sight. Second Sight was a traditional text-based BBS system, unlike products like TeleFinder and FirstClass which supported a graphical interface.

Next, Watson came up with a program for anyone to create a BBS. It was called Red Ryder Host, but later renamed Second Sight. Scott introduced the new program in the same way as Red Ryder, by posting it on bulletin boards. By then, Watson operated his own bulletin board.

See also
Red Ryder

References

Classic Mac OS software
Bulletin board system software